Mortadelo y Filemón: Una Aventura de Cine is a 2000 adventure video game for Windows. It was re-released in Spain in November 2003, and in Germany in 2004 by Crimson Cow, and was developed by Spanish studio Alcachofa Soft. The game is in German, but was never localized to English. It is the third game in the Mort & Phil adventure game series, following El Sulfato Atómico (1998) by Alcachofa and La Máquina Meteoroloca (1999) by Vega Creaciones Multimedia.

See also
Pendulo Studios
Runaway: A Road Adventure

References

2000 video games
Video games based on comics
Video games developed in Spain
Windows games
Windows-only games
Mort & Phil
Alcachofa Soft games